Daniel P. Hanley, A.C.E. (born 1955) is an American film editor with more than 30 feature film credits. Hanley and his editing partner Mike Hill have had a notable collaboration with the director Ron Howard, having edited all of Howard's films since Night Shift (1982). They won an Academy Award for the film Apollo 13 (1995), and the BAFTA Award for the film Rush (2013).

Hanley and Hill's longstanding partnership, which includes 22 films through the 2016 Inferno, may be unique among major film editors. An important aspect of the partnership is that the two editors have developed a sufficiently uniform style that they can simply split up the scenes of each film without specialization.

In addition to Apollo 13, Hanley and Hill have been nominated for Academy Awards for Howard's A Beautiful Mind (2001), Cinderella Man (2005), and Frost/Nixon (2008). Apollo 13 was listed as the 48st best-edited film of all time in a 2012 survey of members of the Motion Picture Editors Guild.
Hanley has been elected as a member of the American Cinema Editors.

Selected filmography
Films directed by Ron Howard

Films with other directors
Armed and Dangerous (Lester-1986)
No Man's Land (Werner-1987)
Pet Sematary (Lambert-1989)
Problem Child (Dugan-1990)
Cop and a Half (Winkler-1993)
Jonah Hex (Hayward-2010)

See also
List of film director and editor collaborations

References

1955 births
Living people
American Cinema Editors
American film editors
Best Editing BAFTA Award winners
Best Film Editing Academy Award winners